The Best of Michael Martin Murphey is the first compilation album by the American singer-songwriter Michael Martin Murphey. It was released in 1985 via EMI America Records. The album includes the singles "What She Wants" and "Carolina in the Pines".

Track listing

Chart performance

References

1984 compilation albums
Michael Martin Murphey albums
Albums produced by Jim Ed Norman
EMI America Records albums